Hyalosagda arboreoides is a species of air-breathing land snail, a terrestrial pulmonate gastropod mollusc in the family Sagdidae.

Distribution 
This species occurs in Jamaica.

References

External links 
 Photos at: 

Sagdidae
Gastropods described in 1845